SkELL (abbreviation of Sketch Engine for Language Learning) is a free corpus-based web tool that allows language learners and teachers find authentic sentences for specific target word(s). For any word or a phrase, SkELL displays a concordance that lists example sentences drawn from a special text corpus crawled from the World Wide Web, which has been cleaned of spam and includes only high-quality texts covering everyday, standard, formal, and professional language. There are versions of SkELL for English, Russian, German, Italian, Czech and Estonian.

SkELL is based on the commercial Sketch Engine corpus manager and the proprietary GDEX (Good Dictionary Examples) score that it implements.

Features 
SkELL can provide three kinds of results for a query:

 Examples: This page displays a concordance created by searching for the specified word or phrase in the reference corpus, taking any derived forms into account.
 Word sketch: This page shows the most frequent collocates for the specified word. It is a simplified version of Sketch Engine's word sketch function.
 Similar words: This page contains visualization of similar (not necessarily just synonymous) words in a word cloud, based on Sketch Engine's distributional thesaurus.

The number of displayed lines in a concordance is limited to 40. However, the frequency of the searched query in the reference corpus is indicated above the concordance as hits per million.

Use 
It has been suggested that SkELL can be used, for instance:

 to obtain illustrative examples of target features, lexical and grammatical;
 to find authentic sentences for the target word(s);
 to help students understand the meaning and/or usage of a word or phrase;
 to help teachers wanting to use example sentences in a class;
 to discover and explore collocates;
 to create gap-fill exercises;
 to have the students find and investigate examples/collocates;
 to draw sentences to be used for translation exercises;
 to teach various kinds of homonyms and polysemous words;

Data 
For each language, SkELL uses a dedicated text corpus, which can also be searched manually in the Sketch Engine using more powerful tools.

For example, the English Corpus for SkELL includes a total of more than 57 million sentences that contain more than one billion words. It is based on the English Wikipedia (a special selection of 130,000 articles), a subset from the English web corpus enTenTen14, the whole of the British National Corpus, and free news sources. The English collection of Project Gutenberg used to be a part of the corpus as well, but was removed due to its too archaic language.

History 
SkELL was first presented in 2014, when only English was supported. In 2015, support for Russian was added, and Czech has been supported since 2017. German, Italian and Estonian were added in 2018.

References

External links 
SkELL – corpus tool for language learners
SkELL: corpus examples for language learning

Vocabulary
Concordances (publishing)
Language learning software
Language-learning websites
Online dictionaries
Online English dictionaries
Russian dictionaries
German dictionaries
Italian dictionaries
Czech dictionaries
Estonian dictionaries
Internet properties established in 2014
Czech educational websites